John Ball (by 1518–56), of Norwich and Scottow, Norfolk, was an English politician.

He was an MP for Norwich in April 1554.

References

Year of birth missing
1556 deaths
Politicians from Norwich
People from North Norfolk (district)
English MPs 1554